Barry Lee Lersch (September 7, 1944 – October 4, 2009) was an American professional baseball pitcher who played Major League Baseball (MLB) for the Philadelphia Phillies (–) and St. Louis Cardinals in .

One of Lersch's great baseball moments was a pitching victory in 1964's annual Midnight Sun Game. He defeated the host Alaska Goldpanners of Fairbanks by a score of 10–5; 2,500 people were on hand to witness his win. The game ended at 2:34 a.m. local time and is in the record books as one of the latest-finishing games in amateur baseball history.

Lersch became a professional later that year when, in December 1964, he signed with the Phillies' organization. He made his MLB debut in April 1969 and spent four full years  through ) in the big leagues. Lersch was primarily a relief pitcher in the majors; of his 169 career games pitched, 53 were starts. He posted an 18–32 won–lost record and a 3.82 career earned run average. All of his decisions (and all but one of his games played) came with struggling Phillies teams. In 570 innings pitched, he allowed 536 hits and 172 bases on balls, and struck out 317. He was credited with nine complete games, six saves and one shutout, a two-hitter against the Montreal Expos on September 30, 1972, at Jarry Park. He was traded along with Craig Robinson from the Phillies to the Braves for Ron Schueler at the Winter Meetings on December 3, 1973.

Lersch died of a heart attack on October 4, 2009, in Aurora, Colorado. He was 65; his body was donated to medical science.

References

External links

Barry Lersch at Baseball Almanac
Barry Lersch at Baseball Gauge
Barry Lersch at Pura Pelota (Venezuelan Professional Baseball League)
Barry Lersch at The Deadball Era

1944 births
2009 deaths
American expatriate baseball players in Mexico
Baseball players from Colorado
Colorado Mesa Mavericks baseball players
Eugene Emeralds players
Florida Instructional League Phillies players
Indios de Ciudad Juárez (minor league) players
Leones del Caracas players
American expatriate baseball players in Venezuela
Major League Baseball pitchers
Mesa Thunderbirds baseball players
Mexican League baseball pitchers
Oklahoma City 89ers players
Philadelphia Phillies players
Richmond Braves players
St. Louis Cardinals players
San Diego Padres (minor league) players
Spartanburg Phillies players
Tidewater Tides players